Sheryl Kara Sandberg (born August 28, 1969) is an American technology executive, philanthropist, and writer. Sandberg served as chief operating officer (COO) of Meta Platforms, a position from which she stepped down in August 2022. She is also the founder of LeanIn.Org. In 2008, she was made COO at Facebook, becoming the company's second-highest ranking official. In June 2012, she was elected to Facebook's board of directors, becoming the first woman to serve on its board. As head of the company's advertising business, Sandberg was credited for making the company profitable. Prior to joining Facebook as its COO, Sandberg was vice president of global online sales and operations at Google and was involved in its philanthropic arm Google.org. Before that, Sandberg served as chief of staff for United States Secretary of the Treasury Lawrence Summers.

In 2012, she was named in the Time 100, an annual list of the most influential people in the world. On Forbes Magazine's 2021 billionaires list, Sandberg is reported to have a net worth of US$1.7 billion, due to her stock holdings in Facebook and in other companies. In 2022, she announced she would be stepping down as Meta COO in the fall but that she would remain on its board.

Early life and education 
Sandberg was born in 1969 in Washington, D.C., to a Jewish family, the daughter of Adele (née Einhorn) and Joel Sandberg, and the oldest of three children. Her father is an ophthalmologist, and her mother was a college teacher of French language.

Her family moved to North Miami Beach, Florida, when she was two years old. She attended North Miami Beach High School, from which she graduated in 1987 ranked ninth in her class. She was sophomore class president, became a member of the National Honor Society, and was on the senior class executive board. Sandberg taught aerobics in the 1980s while in high school.

In 1987, Sandberg enrolled at Harvard College. She graduated in 1991 summa cum laude and Phi Beta Kappa with a Bachelor of Arts in economics and was awarded the John H. Williams Prize for the top graduating student in economics. While at Harvard, she co-founded an organization called Women in Economics and Government. She also met Professor Lawrence Summers, who became her mentor and thesis adviser. Summers recruited her to be his research assistant at the World Bank, where she worked for approximately one year on health projects in India dealing with leprosy, AIDS, and blindness.

In 1993, she enrolled at Harvard Business School and in 1995 she earned her MBA, graduating with the highest distinction. In her first year of business school, she earned a fellowship.

Career

Early career
After graduating from business school in the spring of 1995, Sandberg worked as a management consultant for McKinsey & Company for approximately one year (1995–1996). From 1996 to 2001 she again worked for Lawrence Summers, who was then serving as the United States Secretary of the Treasury under President Bill Clinton, as his chief of staff. Sandberg assisted in the Treasury's work on forgiving debt in the developing world during the Asian financial crisis.

She later joined Google in 2001, where she was responsible for online sales of Google's advertising and publishing products as well as for sales operations of Google's consumer products and Google Book Search. During her time at Google, she grew the ad and sales team from four people to 4,000.

Facebook / Meta Platforms 

In late 2007, Mark Zuckerberg, co-founder and chief executive of Facebook, met Sandberg at a Christmas party held by Dan Rosensweig. Zuckerberg had no formal search for a Chief Operating Officer (COO), but thought of Sandberg as "a perfect fit" for this role. In March 2008, Facebook announced the hiring of Sandberg for the role of COO and her leaving Google.

After joining the company, Sandberg quickly began trying to figure out how to make Facebook profitable. Before she joined, the company was "primarily interested in building a really cool site; profits, they assumed, would follow." By late spring, Facebook's leadership had agreed to rely on advertising, "with the ads discreetly presented"; by 2010, Facebook became profitable. According to Facebook, she oversees the firm's business operations including sales, marketing, business development, human resources, public policy, and communications.

In 2012, she became the eighth member (and the first woman) of Facebook's board of directors.

In April 2014, it was reported that Sandberg had sold over half of her shares in Facebook since the company went public. At the time of Facebook's IPO, she held approximately 41 million shares in the company; after several rounds of sales she is left with around 17.2 million shares, amounting to a stake of 0.5% in the company, worth about $1 billion.

The New York Times published a report in 2018 detailing Sandberg's role in handling Facebook's public relations after revelations of Russian interference in the 2016 United States elections and its Cambridge Analytica data scandal. According to The Wall Street Journal, during a meeting, Zuckerberg blamed Sandberg personally for the outcome of the scandal, and that Sandberg "confided in friends that the exchange rattled her, and she wondered if she should be worried about her job."

On November 29, 2018, The New York Times reported that Sandberg had personally asked Facebook's communications staff to conduct research into George Soros's finances days after Soros publicly criticized tech companies, including Facebook, at the World Economic Forum. In a statement, Facebook said the research into Soros "was already underway when Sheryl [Sandberg] sent an email asking if Mr. Soros had shorted Facebook's stock."

On June 1, 2022, Sandberg announced she would be leaving Meta as COO in the fall of 2022 but would remain on the board of directors. Stating a reason for stepping down, Sandberg stated "it is time for me to write the next chapter of my life."

Boards 
In 2009, Sandberg was named to the board of The Walt Disney Company. She also serves on the boards of Women for Women International, the Center for Global Development, and V-Day. She was previously a board member of Starbucks, Brookings Institution, and Ad Council.

Other work and ventures

In 2008, Sandberg wrote an article for The Huffington Post in support of her mentor, Larry Summers, who was under fire for his comments about women. She was a keynote speaker at the Jewish Community Federation's Business Leadership Council in 2010. In December 2010, she gave a TED speech titled "Why we have too few women leaders." In May 2011, she gave the Commencement Address at the Barnard College graduation ceremony. She spoke as the keynote speaker at the Class Day ceremony at the Harvard Business School in May 2012. In April 2013, she was the keynote speaker during the second annual Entrepreneur Weekend at Colgate University, in Hamilton, New York. In 2015, she signed an open letter which the ONE Campaign had been collecting signatures for; the letter was addressed to Angela Merkel and Nkosazana Dlamini-Zuma, urging them to focus on women as they serve as the head of the G7 in Germany and the AU in South Africa respectively, which will start to set the priorities in development funding before a main UN summit in September 2015 that will establish new development goals for the generation. In 2016, she delivered the Commencement Address at the University of California, Berkeley graduation ceremony. It was the first time she spoke publicly about her husband's death, and stressed the importance of resilience. The following year she delivered the Commencement Address to Virginia Tech's Class of 2017. On June 8, 2018, she gave the Commencement Address for the Massachusetts Institute of Technology in Cambridge, MA. And she has been member of the advisory board of the Peter G. Peterson Foundation.

Lean In 
Sandberg released her first book, Lean In: Women, Work, and the Will to Lead, co-authored by Nell Scovell and published by Knopf on March 11, 2013.

The book concerns business leadership and development, issues with the lack of women in government and business leadership positions, and feminism. As of the fall of 2013, the book had sold more than one million copies and was on top of the bestseller lists since its launch.

Lean In is intended for professional women to help them achieve their career goals and for men who want to contribute to a more equitable society. The book argues that barriers are still preventing women from taking leadership roles in the workplace, barriers such as discrimination, blatant and subtle sexism, and sexual harassment. Sandberg claims there are also barriers that women create for themselves through internalizing systematic discrimination and societal gender roles. Sandberg argues that in order for change to happen women need to break down these societal and personal barriers by striving for and achieving leadership roles. The ultimate goal is to encourage women to lean in to positions of leadership because she believes that by having more female voices in positions of power there will be more equitable opportunities created for everyone.

Criticism of the book includes claims that Sandberg is "too elitist" and another that she is "tone-deaf" to the struggles faced by the average woman in the workplace. The point that women should not have to mimic men and that society needs to change to adapt to women's issues instead is made by former Facebook employee Marissa Orr in Lean Out. For example, the book has been criticized for overlooking the struggles of mothers who may not be able to "lean in." Sandberg mentions both of these issues in the introduction of her book, stating that she is "acutely aware that the vast majority of women are struggling to make ends meet and take care of their families" and that her intention was to "offer advice that would have been useful long before I had heard of Google or Facebook." Furthermore, following the Facebook–Cambridge Analytica data scandal, Sandberg's willingness to actually lean in has been put into question. "She's not leaning in at all," McNamee said, in a reference Sandberg's widely read book published five years ago. "If ever there was a time for her to lean in, this is it."

In her book, she does suggest other women to lean in during challenges.

Instead, she has been perceived as a COO who avoids engaging in this crisis.
"Sandberg, the architect of the business model that is now the subject of so much scrutiny, has remained silent in public." In her book she recognizes those who do tackle crises:

Option B 
Sandberg released her second book, Option B, in April 2017. Option B is co-authored with Adam Grant, a professor at the Wharton School of the University of Pennsylvania. The book puts emphasis on grief and resilience in challenges within life. It offers practical tips for creating resilience in the family and community. 2.75 million copies have been sold since publication.

Ban Bossy 

In March 2014, Sandberg and Lean In sponsored the Ban Bossy campaign, a television and social media campaign designed to discourage the word bossy from general use due to its perceived harmful effect on young girls. Several video spots with spokespersons including Beyoncé, Jennifer Garner, and Condoleezza Rice among others were produced along with a web site providing school training material, leadership tips, and an online pledge form to which visitors can promise not to use the word.

Sheryl Sandberg & Dave Goldberg Family Foundation 

In November 2016, Sandberg renamed her Lean In Foundation to the Sheryl Sandberg & Dave Goldberg Family Foundation, after herself and her late husband. This new foundation serves as an umbrella for LeanIn.Org and a new organization around her book Option B. Sandberg also transferred roughly $100,000,000 in Facebook stock to fund the foundation and other charitable endeavors.

Personal life 
Sandberg married Brian Kraff in 1993 and divorced a year later. In 2004, she married Dave Goldberg, then an executive with Yahoo! and later CEO of SurveyMonkey. The couple have a son and a daughter.
Sandberg and Goldberg frequently discussed being in a shared earning/shared parenting marriage. Sandberg also raised the issue of single parenting conflicting strongly with professional and economic development in America.

On May 1, 2015, Dave Goldberg died unexpectedly, and his death was originally reported as resulting from sustaining a head trauma falling from a treadmill, while the couple was vacationing in Mexico. Sandberg has subsequently said that her husband's cause of death was due to an arrhythmia, and not due to falling from a treadmill.

Sandberg dated Activision Blizzard CEO Bobby Kotick from 2016 to 2019. According to an April 21, 2022 report by The Wall Street Journal, Sandberg was part of a coordinated campaign to prevent the Daily Mail from publishing a story about a temporary restraining order towards Kotick by a former girlfriend in 2014. At the time of The Journal's report, Kotick's company was facing lawsuits over allegations of widespread sexual misconduct, of which Kotick himself was alleged to have participated in. These campaigns occurred first in 2016 (when Sandberg and Kotick began dating), and again in 2019 (the year they broke up). The Journal stated that Facebook was reviewing whether Sandberg violated the company’s rules.

On February 3, 2020, she announced her engagement on Facebook to Kelton Global CEO Tom Bernthal. They were married in August 2022. Bernthal has three children and Sandberg has two, and they live together in Menlo Park, California.

Politics 
Sandberg supported Hillary Clinton in the 2016 presidential election. She declined to endorse Elizabeth Warren, an outspoken critic of Facebook, multiple times throughout the 2020 Democratic Party presidential primaries, though stated, "I imagine I will support a Democratic nominee" over incumbent Donald Trump.

Honors 

 Sandberg has been ranked one of the 50 "Most Powerful Women in Business" by Fortune Magazine:
 In 2007 she was ranked No. 29 and was the youngest woman on the list.
 In 2008 she was ranked No. 34.
 In 2009 she was ranked No. 22.
 In 2010 she was ranked No. 16.
 In 2014 she was ranked No. 10.
 In 2016 she was ranked No. 6.
 In 2017 she was ranked No. 5.
 In 2018 she was ranked No. 6.
On the list of 50 "Women to Watch" by The Wall Street Journal.
 She was ranked No. 19 on that list in 2007.
 She was ranked No. 21 on that list in 2008.
 Sandberg was named one of the "25 Most Influential People on the Web" by Business Week in 2009.
 She has been listed as one of the world's 100 most powerful women by Forbes. In 2014, Sandberg was No. 9, just behind Michelle Obama, No. 4 in 2017, and No. 36 in 2021.
 In 2012, Newsweek and The Daily Beast released their first "Digital Power Index", a list of the 100 most significant people in the digital world that year (plus 10 additional "Lifetime Achievement" winners), and she was ranked No. 3 in the "Evangelists" category.
 In 2012, she was named in Time 100, an annual list of the 100 most influential people in the world assembled by Time.
 Lean In was shortlisted for the Financial Times and Goldman Sachs Business Book of the Year Award (2013).
 In 2013, she was ranked Time 1008 on "The World's 50 Most Influential Jews" conducted by The Jerusalem Post.

Books 
 Lean In: Women, Work, and the Will to Lead. Knopf. 2013. 
 Written with Adam Grant: Option B: Facing Adversity, Building Resilience and Finding Joy. Knopf. 2017.

References

External links

 Sheryl Sandberg on Facebook
 

1969 births
21st-century American businesswomen
21st-century American non-fiction writers
21st-century American women writers
Goldbergs
Activists from the San Francisco Bay Area
American billionaires
American business writers
American chief operating officers
American computer businesspeople
American feminist writers
American health activists
American management consultants
American nonprofit executives
American philanthropists
American technology chief executives
American technology writers
American women chief executives
American women non-fiction writers
Businesspeople from Miami
Businesspeople from the San Francisco Bay Area
Businesspeople from Washington, D.C.
California Democrats
Censorship in the United States
Clinton administration personnel
Directors of Meta Platforms
Directors of Starbucks
Directors of The Walt Disney Company
Facebook employees
Female billionaires
Florida Democrats
Goldbergs
Google employees
Harvard Business School alumni
Harvard College alumni
HIV/AIDS activists
Jewish activists
Jewish American philanthropists
Jewish American writers
Jewish feminists
Jewish women writers
Living people
Maryland Democrats
McKinsey & Company people
People from Boca Raton, Florida
People from North Miami Beach, Florida
People from Menlo Park, California
United States Department of the Treasury officials
Women business writers
World Bank people
Writers from Miami
Writers from the San Francisco Bay Area
Writers from Washington, D.C.